UFC on Fox: dos Santos vs. Miocic (also known as UFC on Fox 13) was a mixed martial arts event held at U.S. Airways Center in Phoenix, Arizona, on December 13, 2014.

Background
The event was the first that the organization has hosted in Arizona. Zuffa previously hosted the final World Extreme Cagefighting event, WEC 53, in nearby Glendale in 2010.

The fight card was headlined by a heavyweight bout between Junior dos Santos and Stipe Miocic.

Jussier Formiga was expected to face John Moraga at the event. However, Formiga was forced to pull out of the fight due to injury and was replaced by UFC newcomer Willie Gates.

Nate Diaz missed weight on his first attempt at the weigh-ins, weighing in at 160.6 pounds. He was given additional time to make the lightweight limit, but made no attempt to cut further. Instead, he was fined 20 percent of his purse, which went to Rafael dos Anjos.

A middleweight bout between Ed Herman and Derek Brunson, slated for the televised preliminary portion of the event, was cancelled on the day of the event, as Brunson was stricken with a stomach ailment. The fight was rescheduled to take place the following month at UFC 183.

Results

Bonus awards
The following fighters were awarded $50,000 bonuses:
 Fight of the Night: Junior dos Santos vs. Stipe Miocic
 Performance of the Night: Matt Mitrione and Ian Entwistle

Reported payout
The following is the reported payout to the fighters as reported to the Arizona Boxing and MMA Commission. It does not include sponsor money and also does not include the UFC's traditional "fight night" bonuses.
 Junior dos Santos: $260,000 (includes $130,000 win bonus) def. Stipe Miocic: $30,000
 Rafael dos Anjos: $86,000 (includes $41,000 win bonus) def. Nate Diaz: $16,000 ^
 Alistair Overeem: $150,000 (includes $50,000 win bonus) def. Stefan Struve: $40,000
 Matt Mitrione: $66,000 (includes $33,000 win bonus) def. Gabriel Gonzaga: $38,000
 Joanna Jędrzejczyk: $20,000 (includes $10,000 win bonus) def. Cláudia Gadelha: $10,000
 John Moraga: $50,000 (includes $25,000 win bonus) def. Willie Gates: $8,000
 Ben Saunders: $28,000 (includes $14,000 win bonus) def. Joe Riggs: $16,000
 Drew Dober: $16,000 (includes $8,000 win bonus) def. Jamie Varner: $20,000
 Ed Herman: $47,000 vs. Derek Brunson: N/A <
 Bryan Barberena: $16,000 (includes $8,000 win bonus) def. Joe Ellenberger: $10,000
 David Michaud: $16,000 (includes $8,000 win bonus) def. Garrett Whiteley: $8,000
 Henry Cejudo: $30,000 (includes $15,000 win bonus) def. Dustin Kimura: $15,000
 Ian Entwistle: $16,000 (includes $8,000 win bonus) def. Anthony Birchak: $8,000

^ Diaz was fined $4,000, 20 percent of his purse for failing to make the required weight for his fight with Rafael dos Anjos.  That money was issued to Dos Anjos, officials confirmed.
< Bout did not take place as Brunson was unable to compete after becoming ill the day of the fight.  Herman was paid his show money.

See also
 List of UFC events
 2014 in UFC

References

Fox UFC
Mixed martial arts in Arizona
Sports competitions in Phoenix, Arizona
2014 in mixed martial arts
Events in Phoenix, Arizona